I Don't Want to Be an Adult is a 1982 Soviet comedy film directed by Yuri Chulyukin.

Plot 
The film tells about the boy Pavlik, whom his parents make a lot to read and study well. Once Pavlik visits his grandmother, who lives in the village, gets permission for independent walks and decides to go to Moscow.

Cast 
 Kirill Golovko-Sersky as Pavlik
 Natalya Varley as Katya
 Yevgeny Steblov as Dima
 Yevgenya Melnikova as Varvara Petrovna
 Yelena Valyushkina as Sveta
 Vladimir Zaitsev as Andrey Nikitin
 Lyudmila Chulyukina as Galya
 Vladimir Dudin as Yur Yurich
 Yanina Lisovskaya as Marina
 Pavel Vinnik as Vasily Sergeyevich

References

External links 
 

1982 films
Films scored by Gennady Gladkov
1980s Russian-language films
Soviet comedy films
1982 comedy films